This is a list of books in the Choose Your Own Adventure gamebook series and its various spin-off series.

Books published by Bantam Books (1979–1998)

Choose Your Own Adventure

Choose Your Own Adventure for Younger Readers (Bantam-Skylark) 
These books are written for a simpler reading level than the main series and have less severe "bad endings".

Choose Your Own Adventure: Walt Disney Series 
These books involve the worlds of the many different Disney films and featurettes.

Choose Your Own Super Adventure 
These books are longer and more complex than the books in the regular series.

Choose Your Own Adventure: Passport 
This series is more educational and casts the reader as a member of a globe-trotting news team.

Choose Your Own Nightmare 
The success of R.L. Stine's Goosebumps horror novels inspired a flood of children's horror books, including this Choose Your Own Adventure spin-off series. The same year, Goosebumps began the Give Yourself Goosebumps series under a similar concept.  Some of the following titles have been made into computer games/movies by Multipath Movies

Choose Your Own Adventure, The Young Indiana Jones Chronicles 
These books were based on The Young Indiana Jones Chronicles television show.

 The Valley of the Kings by Richard Brightfield, 1992
 South of the Border by Richard Brightfield, 1992
 Revolution in Russia by Richard Brightfield, 1992
 Masters of the Louvre by Richard Brightfield, 1992
 African Safari by Richard Brightfield, 1993
 Behind the Great Wall by Richard Brightfield, 1993
 The Roaring Twenties by Richard Brightfield, 1993
 The Irish Rebellion by Richard Brightfield, 1993

Choose Your Own Star Wars Adventure 
These books were based on the original Star Wars Trilogy.

 A New Hope by Christopher Golden, 1998
 The Empire Strikes Back by Christopher Golden, 1998
 Return of the Jedi by Christopher Golden, 1998

Choose Your Own First Adventure 
These books were published between 1984 and 1987 and were aimed at very young readers.  Each book contains one central choice for the reader to make.
 Little Owl Leaves the Nest by Marcia Leonard
 Little Pig’s Birthday by Marcia Leonard
 Little Rabbit’s Baby Sister by Marcia Leonard
 Little Duck Finds a Friend by Marcia Leonard
 Little Mouse Makes a Mess by Marcia Leonard
 Little Panda Gets Lost by Marcia Leonard
 Little Kangaroo’s Bad Day by Marcia Leonard
 Little Raccoon Goes to the Beach by Marcia Leonard
 Little Kitten Sleeps Over by Marcia Leonard
 Little Puppy’s Rainy Day by Marcia Leonard
 Little Fox's Best Friend by Marcia Leonard
 Little Goat’s Big Big Brother by Marcia Leonard

Choose Your Own Adventure – Space Hawks 
 Faster than Light by Edward Packard
 Alien Invaders by Edward Packard
 Space Fortress by Edward Packard
 The Comet Masters by Edward Packard
 The Fiber People by Edward Packard
 The Planet Eater by Edward Packard

Books published by Chooseco (2005–present) 
In 2005, Chooseco began republishing selected titles from the Choose Your Own Adventure family of books.

Choose Your Own Adventure 

These are the original books, updated with revised text and new artwork, as well as brand-new titles.
 The Abominable Snowman by R. A. Montgomery (2005)
 Journey Under The Sea by R. A. Montgomery (2005)
 Space And Beyond by R. A. Montgomery (2005)
 The Lost Jewels of Nabooti by R. A. Montgomery (2005)
 Mystery of the Maya by R. A. Montgomery (2005)
 House of Danger by R. A. Montgomery (2005)
 Race Forever by R. A. Montgomery (2005)
 Escape by R. A. Montgomery (2005)
 Lost in the Amazon by R. A. Montgomery (2005)
 Prisoner of the Ant People by R. A. Montgomery (2005)
 Trouble on Planet Earth by R. A. Montgomery (2005)
 War with the Evil Power Master by R. A. Montgomery (2005)
 Cup Of Death/The Mystery of Ura Senke by Shannon Gilligan (2005)
 The Case of the Silk King by Shannon Gilligan (2005)
 Beyond Escape! by R. A. Montgomery (2005)
 Secret of the Ninja by Jay Leibold (2005)
 The Brilliant Dr. Wogan by R. A. Montgomery (2005)
 Return to Atlantis by R. A. Montgomery (2005)
 Forecast From Stonehenge by R. A. Montgomery (2007)
 Inca Gold by Jim Becket (2007)
 Struggle Down Under/Terror in Australia by Shannon Gilligan (2007)
 Tattoo of Death by R. A. Montgomery (2007)
 Silver Wings by R. A. Montgomery (2007)
 Terror on the Titanic by Jim Wallace (2007)
 Search for the Mountain Gorillas by Jim Wallace (2008)
 Moon Quest by Anson Montgomery (2008)
 Project UFO by R. A. Montgomery (2008)
 Island of Time by R. A. Montgomery (2008)
 Smoke Jumper by R. A. Montgomery (2009)
 Chinese Dragons by R. A. Montgomery (2009)
 Track Star! by R. A. Montgomery (2009)
 U.N. Adventure: Mission To Molowa by Ramsey Montgomery (2009)
 Blood on the Handle by R. A. Montgomery (2010)
 Zombie Penpal by Ken McMurtry (2010)
 Behind the Wheel  by R. A. Montgomery (2010)
 Punishment: Earth by R. A. Montgomery (2010)
 Pirate Treasure of the Onyx Dragon by Alison Gilligan (2011)
 Search For The Black Rhino by Alison Gilligan (2011)
 The Curse Of The Pirate Mist by Doug Wilhelm (2011)
 The Trail Of Lost Time by R. A. Montgomery (2011)

Published as an additional entry to the original series:

Additional unnumbered books:
 By Balloon to the Sahara by D. Terman (2015)
 The Magic of the Unicorn by Deborah Lerme Goodman (2017)
 Surf Monkeys by Jay Leibold (2017)
 The Throne of Zeus by Deborah Lerme Goodman (2018)
 The Trumpet of Terror by Deborah Lerme Goodman (2018)
 Return of the Ninja by Jay Leibold (2019)
 The Lost Ninja by Jay Leibold (2019)
 Time Travel Inn by Bart King (2021)
 The Rescue of the Unicorn by Deborah Lerme Goodman (2021)
 The Flight of the Unicorn by Deborah Lerme Goodman (2022)
 Antarctica! by Lily Simonson (2022)
 Brooklyn Mermaid by C. E. Simpson (2022)

Choose Your Own Adventure: The Golden Path 
The books in this series are set on a dangerous future Earth where the government cannot be trusted and powerful mystical forces are at work. The series forms a continuing storyline, and each book can lead the reader to different starting points in the following volume depending on which ending is reached.
 Into the Hollow Earth by Anson Montgomery (2008)
 Burned by the Inner Sun by Anson Montgomery (2008)
 Paying the Ferryman by Anson Montgomery (announced but not yet published)

Dragonlarks 
These are republications of Choose Your Own Adventure for Younger Readers books, with revised text, new coloured art and a larger format.
 Caravan by R. A. Montgomery (2006)
 Indian Trail by R. A. Montgomery (2006)
 Your Very Own Robot by R. A. Montgomery (2006)
 The Haunted House by R. A. Montgomery (2006)
 The Lake Monster Mystery by Shannon Gilligan (2008) (revision of The Search for Champ)
 Always Picked Last by R. A. Montgomery
 Your Purrr-fect Birthday by R. A. Montgomery
 Ghost Island by Shannon Gilligan (revision of Haunted Harbor)

Sorted by grade level:
Kindergarten:
 The Haunted House by R. A. Montgomery
 Monsters Of The Deep by R. A. Montgomery
 Lost Dog! by R. A. Montgomery
Grade 1:
 Your Very Own Robot by R. A. Montgomery
 Indian Trail by R. A. Montgomery
 Your Purrr-fect Birthday by R. A. Montgomery
 Sand Castle by R. A. Montgomery
 The Lake Monster Mystery by Shannon Gilligan
 Owl Tree by R. A. Montgomery
 Return To The Haunted House by R. A. Montgomery

Choose Your Own Adventure Nightmare 
 Eighth Grade Witch by C. E. Simpson (2014)
 Blood Island by Liz Windover (2014)
 Snake Invasion by Doug Wilhelm (2016)

Choose Your Own Adventure: Spies 
 James Armistead Lafayette by Kyandreia Jones (2019)
 Mata Hari by Katherine Factor (2019)
 Harry Houdini by Katherine Factor (2020)
 Noor Inayat Khan by Rana Tahir (2020)
 Mary Bowser by Kyandreia Jones (2020)
 Spy for Cleopatra by Katherine Factor (2021)
 Moe Berg by Bart King (2022)

Choose Your Own Adventure: The Citadel of Whispers 
 The Citadel of Whispers by Kazim Ali (2021)

Books published by McGraw-Hill Education (2011–present) 
This series is published by McGraw-Hill Education under license from Chooseco. It adapts 30 of the Chooseco reissues, aiming them primarily at ESL learners. A graded reader series uses simplified language, suitable for struggling readers and for those learning English as a second language. See also Extensive reading.

Choose Your Own Adventure Graded Readers

References 

 Adventures of You Series, Vermont Crossroads Press, owned by Constance Cappel and R.A. Montgomery in Waitsfield, Vermont. Books published: 1. Sugarcane Island, Edward Packard, 1976 and 2. R.A. Montgomery (Robert Mountain), Journey Under the Sea, 1976.

External links 
 Demian's Choose Your Own Adventure listing Information on all the Choose Your Own Adventure and other gamebook titles.

List 
Lists of novels